Betty Burfeindt (born July 20, 1945 in New York City) is a retired American golfer who played on the LPGA Tour. She attended Cortland State University in New York and her rookie season on tour was 1969.

Burfeindt won four times on tour, and her last was her only major championship, the LPGA Championship in 1976, in which she finished one stroke ahead of runner-up Judy Rankin. Her two best years were 1972 and 1973, with consecutive fourth-place finishes on the money list. Burfeindt's last season on tour was 1981, and although just  in height, she was one of the longest hitters on the LPGA Tour in the 1970s.

Professional wins

LPGA Tour wins (4)

LPGA Tour playoff record (0–2)

Major championship

Wins (1)

References

External links

American female golfers
LPGA Tour golfers
Winners of LPGA major golf championships
Golfers from New York (state)
Sportspeople from New York City
1945 births
Living people
21st-century American women